Chrysolina sturmi is a metallic purple beetle of the Chrysomelidae family, that can be found in Europe and Western Asia.

They feed on Glechoma hederacea, Galium and Cirsium.

External links
www.insektenbox.de

Chrysomelinae
Beetles of Europe
Beetles described in 1882